Lawrence Thomas Ciaffone (August 17, 1924 – December 14, 1991), nicknamed "Symphony Larry", was an American professional baseball player whose ten-year playing career (1946–55), largely as an outfielder, catcher and first baseman, included a six-game trial with the St. Louis Cardinals of Major League Baseball during the opening weeks of the  season.

Born in Brooklyn, New York, he attended Abraham Lincoln High School, where he was a teammate of and catcher for his cousin Frank Ciaffone, a star pitcher. Both signed with the Brooklyn Dodgers upon graduation but their baseball careers were delayed by military service in World War II.  Larry entered the United States Army, and saw combat at the Battle of the Bulge in 1944–45.  Frank enlisted in the United States Marines and fought in the Pacific Theater of Operations, participating in the Battle of Iwo Jima. During the course of the invasion of the Japanese stronghold, Frank Ciaffone, 19, was fatally wounded on March 3, 1945.

Returning from wartime service at the age of 22, Larry Ciaffone began his playing career in the Brooklyn farm system, but was drafted by the Cardinals after only one season at the Class B level. He progressed through the Cardinal system, and after batting .324 for the Triple-A Rochester Red Wings in 1950, he made the Cardinals' early-season, 28-man roster in 1951. Ciaffone appeared in six games as a pinch hitter and substitute left fielder. He went hitless in five at bats with one base on balls, then returned to Rochester for the balance of the season.

References

External links

Retrosheet
Venezuelan Professional Baseball League statistics

1924 births
1991 deaths
Abraham Lincoln High School (Brooklyn) alumni
Allentown Cardinals players
United States Army personnel of World War II
Chattanooga Lookouts players
Houston Buffaloes players
Major League Baseball outfielders
New York Mets scouts
Newport News Dodgers players
Sportspeople from Brooklyn
Baseball players from New York City
Richmond Virginians (minor league) players
Rochester Red Wings players
Sabios de Vargas players
St. Louis Cardinals players
St. Louis Cardinals scouts
Military personnel from New York City
Burials at Green-Wood Cemetery